Wuyts is a Dutch patronymic surname, most common in the province of the Belgian Antwerp, where Wuyt was a local short form of Wouter. People with this name include:

Bart Wuyts (born 1969), Belgian tennis player
Gustaaf Wuyts (1903–1979), Belgian  tug of war competitor, shot putter and discus thrower
Jules Wuyts (1886–?), Belgian swimmer
Marc Wuyts (born 1967), Belgian football forward and coach
Peter Wuyts (born 1973), Belgian racing cyclist

References

Dutch-language surnames
Surnames of Belgian origin
Patronymic surnames